Jean Palutikof is founding Director of the National Climate Change Adaptation Research Facility (NCCARF) at Griffith University in Queensland, Australia. She has held this position since 2008. Prior to this, Professor Palutikof was based at the UK Met Office during which time she managed the production of the Intergovernmental Panel on Climate Change (IPCC) Fourth Assessment Report for Working Group II (Impacts, Adaptation and Vulnerability).

Professor Palutikof is among the foremost scholars of climate change adaptation and was lead author and review editor for several assessments of the Intergovernmental Panel on Climate Change (IPCC) and was present in Oslo at the ceremony at which the IPCC received the Nobel Peace Prize.

Career
Between 1974 and 1979 Professor Palutikof worked as a lecturer in the Department of Geography at the University of Nairobi.

Between 1979 and 2004 Professor Palutikof worked at the University of East Anglia in the United Kingdom in the School of Environmental Sciences and as Director of the Climatic Research Unit.

Research
Professor Palutikof's research focuses on the area of climate change - particularly the application of climatic data to economic and planning issues. Her area of speciality is extreme events and their impacts.

She has published over 200 pieces of research on the topic of anthropogenic climate change and climate variability.

Speaking engagements
In 2010, to launch Indiana University's William T. Patten Lecture Series Professor Palutikof presented two public lectures. These were titled "The Role of International Treaties in Tackling Climate Change" and "Adaptation Strategies: A Poor Man's Solution?".

Books
Professor Palutikof has co-authored several books including the following:

The Nature and Causes of climate Change: Assessing the long-term future
Natural Disasters and Adaptation to Climate Change
Climate Adaptation Futures

References

Year of birth missing (living people)
Living people
Academics of the University of East Anglia
Australian women scientists